Betanure Jewish Neo-Aramaic, the local language variety of Betanure in Iraqi Kurdistan, is among the rarest and most seriously endangered varieties of Aramaic spoken at the present time. It is also one of the most conservative of both Jewish Neo-Aramaic languages and the Northeastern Neo-Aramaic languages in particular.

History
In the 1940s, Betanure Jewish Neo-Aramaic was spoken by seventeen large families in the Jewish village of Betanure. The community migrated in its entirety to Israel in 1951. Ever since the dialect has been facing erosion from Israeli Hebrew and from other Neo-Aramaic varieties spoken in Israel.

Phonology

See also
Jewish Neo-Aramaic dialect of Zakho
Inter-Zab Jewish Neo-Aramaic
Judeo-Aramaic languages

References

Bibliography

Jewish Northeastern Neo-Aramaic dialects
Languages of Israel
Languages of Iraq
Endangered Afroasiatic languages
Dialects by location
Languages of Kurdistan